Carl William Albert Raguse (March 19, 1902 – March 1, 1988) was an American equestrian. He competed in two events at the 1936 Summer Olympics.

Biography
Carl Raguse was born in Auburn, New York on March 19, 1902. He graduated from the United States Military Academy at West Point in 1924.

He died in San Antonio, Texas on March 1, 1988.

References

1902 births
1988 deaths
American male equestrians
Olympic equestrians of the United States
Equestrians at the 1936 Summer Olympics
Sportspeople from Auburn, New York
United States Army colonels
United States Military Academy alumni
Burials at Fort Sam Houston National Cemetery